

Hermann Geyer (7 July 1882 – 10 April 1946) was a German general during World War II who commanded the IX Army Corps. He was a recipient of the Knight's Cross of the Iron Cross of Nazi Germany. Geyer retired in 1943 and committed suicide in 1946.

World War I

On January 1, 1918, the German Army published a pamphlet written by Captain Hermann Geyer entitled The Attack in Position Warfare. The pamphlet described infantry infiltration tactics, the role of following supporting forces and the role of aviation. These tactics were used in the German 1918 Spring Offensive or Kaiserschlacht (Kaiser's Battle).

Awards and decorations

 Knight's Cross of the Iron Cross on 25 June 1940 as General der Infanterie and commander of IX. Armeekorps

References

Citations

Bibliography

 
 Paschall, Colonel Rod, author, John S. D. Eisenhower ed. and introduction. The Defeat of Imperial Germany 1917-1918. New York: Da Capo Press, 1994. . p. 130. Originally published Chapel Hill, NC: Algonquin of Chapel Hill, 1989.

1882 births
1946 deaths
Military personnel from Stuttgart
People from the Kingdom of Württemberg
German Army generals of World War II
Generals of Infantry (Wehrmacht)
German Army personnel of World War I
Prussian Army personnel
Recipients of the Knight's Cross of the Iron Cross
Recipients of the Silver Liakat Medal
Officers of the Order of Military Merit (Bulgaria)
German military personnel who committed suicide
Recipients of the clasp to the Iron Cross, 1st class
Lieutenant generals of the Reichswehr
1946 suicides